Deutsche Elektronische Musik 3 is a 2017 compilation of krautrock music released by Soul Jazz Records.

Music and contents
Deutsche Elektronische Musik 3 was a 23-track collection, and the third in the series of Soul Jazz Records collection of German krautrock, rock and electronic music. Oregano Rathbone of Record Collector found the album to contain more obscurities than previous entries. Ludovic Hunter-Tilney of Financial Times found that the claim of rock and electronic music which made it "hard to discern much in the way of elektronische musik in the joss-stick fragranced sitar drones of Bröselmaschine's "Schmetterling" or Popol Vuh's Bavarian reorientation of West Coast hippy rock" Adrian Pontecrovo of PopMatters found the album drew from both British and American rock while others drew from Eastern music for inspiration such as Dzyan's "Khali".

Release and reception

Deutsche Elektronische Musik 3 was released in December 2017.

Hunter-Tilney of Financial Times praised the album claiming that " there can be no faulting the snapshot provided of West Germany's thriving underground music scene between 1971 and 1981." Pontecrovo of PopMatters praised the album, finding it to be "not about name-dropping, as tends to be the case with Soul Jazz compilations" but an album that has "variety and diversity as can be packed into a single thematic compilation [...] it's ready to blow your mind with sounds and songs you never knew you wanted and a much broader picture of vintage West Germany than perhaps any previous collection of tunes has given us thus far." Oregano Rathbone of Record Collector gave the album a four star rating, declaring that "Deutsche Elektronische Musik compilations are curated with care"

Track listing
Track listing adapted from the album's liner notes and sleeve.

Disc 2

References

Sources
 
 
 
  Various Artists|date=January 29, 2018|last=Rathbone|first=Oregano|accessdate=January 13, 2021}}

2017 compilation albums
Soul Jazz Records compilation albums
Krautrock albums